The 1904 Tempe Normal Owls football team was an American football team that represented Tempe Normal School (later renamed Arizona State University) as an independent during the 1904 college football season. In their sixth season under head coach Frederick M. Irish, the Owls compiled a 4–0 record, shut out all four opponents, and outscored their opponents by a combined total of 116 to 0. The team won games against the Phoenix High School (two games: 15–0, 30–0) and the Phoenix Indians (two games: 24–0, 47–0).

Schedule

References

Tempe Normal
Arizona State Sun Devils football seasons
College football undefeated seasons
Tempe Normal Owls football